Hibbertia huegelii is a species of flowering plant in the family Dilleniaceae and is endemic to the south-west of Western Australia. It is an erect, spreading or prostrate shrub with hairy branchlets, linear leaves and yellow flowers arranged singly in leaf axils on the ends of shoots, with fifteen to twenty-five stamens in bundles around the four or five carpels.

Description
There are fifteen to twenty-five stamens arranged in bundles of five, alternating with four or five glabrous carpels, each carpel with a single ovule.

Taxonomy
This species was first formally described in 1837 by Stephan Endlicher in Enumeratio plantarum quas in Novae Hollandiae ora austro-occidentali ad fluvium Cygnorum et in sinu Regis Georgii collegit Carolus Liber Baro de Hügel and given the name Candollea huegelii. In 1880, Ferdinand von Mueller changed the name to Hibbertia huegelii in Fragmenta phytographiae Australiae. The specific epithet (huegelii) honours Charles von Hügel.

Distribution and habitat
Hibbertia huegelii grows in woodland, mostly on the Darling Range in the Avon Wheatbelt, Geraldton Sandplains, Jarrah Forest and Swan Coastal Plain biogeographic regions south-western Western Australia.

Conservation status
Hibbertia huegelii is classified as "not threatened" by the Western Australian Government Department of Parks and Wildlife.

See also
List of Hibbertia species

References

huegelii
Flora of Western Australia
Plants described in 1837
Taxa named by Stephan Endlicher